Ailson Henrique Brites (also known as  "Jucão" ) (born December 6, 1965) is a Brazilian Jiu-Jitsu (BJJ) expert and World Champion 6th degree black belt under Carlos Gracie Jr.

Biography
Multiple time World Champion, Professor Ailson “Jucão” Henrique Brites began practicing Brazilian Jiu Jitsu at the age of 10. His uncle, Amilton Brites, a long-time practitioner of Brazilian Jiu Jitsu, brought both Jucão and his brother, Admilson "Juquinha" Brites, to the Academia Serrana in Teresópolis. Jucão's first teachers were his other uncle, grandmaster Geny Rebello, Rebello's son Professor Cirillo Azevedo, and Professor Elias Martins.

While still in high school, Jucão was introduced to the Machado brothers, who were already well known for their Jiu-Jitsu. After 11 years of training at the Academia Serrana, Carlos Machado invited Jucão to train under Carlos Gracie Jr. at his famous academy Gracie Barra. After several more years there, Jucão received his black belt from Carlos Gracie Jr. on January 23, 1993.

In August 1995, Jucão's uncle Grandmaster Armando Wriedt, invited him to move to Brasilia. Jucão began teaching classes there at the Academia Dalmo Ribeiro.

In his nearly 40 years of training and teaching, Jucão has formed many internationally recognized athletes, both as champions and professors of Brazilian Jiu Jitsu. As a competitor, he has fought in over 1000 Jiu Jitsu matches and won many championships.

You can find Jucão most days of the week happily rolling with his students in Manhattan, NY and Garwood, NJ. Jucão founded his US school in 2008 Equipe Jucão USA in New York City and it has been growing ever since. He also regularly teaches at Storming Mountain Academy in White Plains, New York and Ronin Jiu Jitsu Academy, Fight and Fitness MMA Garwood NJ, and Battle Ground MMA in New Jersey.

Instructor lineage
Carlos Gracie, Sr. → Helio Gracie→ Carlos Gracie Jr. → Ailson “Jucão” Henrique Brites

Grappling credentials

 2015 1st Place Pan Jiu-Jitsu Championship 2014 in Open Master 4 division

 2014 1st Place Pan Jiu-Jitsu Championship 2014 in Super Heavy Master 4 division

 2014 1st Place Pan Jiu-Jitsu Championship 2014 in Open Master 4 division

 2014 1st Place European Open Jiu-Jitsu Championship 2014 in Heavy Master 4 division

 2014 1st Place European Open Jiu-Jitsu Championship 2014 in Open Master 4 division

 2013 1st Place World Jiu-Jitsu Championship – Master and Seniors 2013 in Heavy Seniors 3 division

 2013 1st/2nd Place World Jiu-Jitsu Championship – Master and Seniors 2013 in Open Seniors 3 division ♦Jucao bows out to younger brother Admilson "Juquinha" Brites, who graciously accepts the victory as these incredibly talented BJJ brothers once again meet in the finals of a major tournament 
 2013 1st Place Pan Jiu-Jitsu No-Gi Championship 2013 in Heavy Seniors 3 division

 2013 1st/2nd Place Pan Jiu-Jitsu No-Gi Championship 2013 in Heavy Seniors 3 division ♦Jucao bows out to younger brother Admilson "Juquinha" Brites, who graciously accepts the victory
 2012 1st Place European No Gi Open Jiu-Jitsu Championship in Super Heavy Seniors 3 division

 2012 1st Place European No Gi Open Jiu-Jitsu Championship in Open Seniors 3 division

 2012 1st Place London International Open IBJJF Championship in Super Heavy Seniors 3 division

 2012 1st Place London International Open IBJJF Championship in Open Seniors 3 division

 2012 1st Place Pan Jiu-Jitsu No-Gi Championship in Super Heavy Seniors 3 division

 2012 1st Place Pan Jiu-Jitsu No-Gi Championship in Open Seniors 3 division

 2012 1st Place European Open Jiu-Jitsu Championship in Open Seniors 3 division
 2012 2nd Place European Open Jiu-Jitsu Championship in Heavy Seniors 3 division
 2010 3rd Place Pan Jiu-Jitsu No-Gi Championship in Super Heavy and Open Seniors 2 divisions
 2009 1st Place New York Open Champion in Super Heavy and Open divisions
 2008 1st Place Pan No-Gi Champion in Heavy and Open divisions
 2008 1st Place Pan Champion in Heavy and Open divisions
 2008 1st Place NAGA World Champion
 2004 1st Place European Open Champion in Heavy and Open divisions
 Brazilian National Championship

2004 1st Place in Senior 1 Heavy Division, 1st Place in Senior 1 Open divisions
1999 1st Place in Master Heavy Division, 1st Place in Master Open division

 International Master and Senior Championship

2004 1st Place in Senior 1 Heavy division
2003 1st Place in Senior 1 Open division
2002 1st Place in Senior 1 Open division, 3rd Place in Senior 1 Heavy division
2001 1st Place in Senior 1 Heavy division, 3rd Place in Senior 1 Open division
 3x Mundials Championship Bronze Medalist

DVDs and videos
Sweeps & Submissions DVD by Ailson "Jucao" Brites #12221 (budovideos.com)

See also
List of Brazilian Jiu-Jitsu practitioners

References

External links
 Equipe Jucão USA Official Website
 Equipe Jucão USA Official Facebook

1965 births
Living people
Brazilian practitioners of Brazilian jiu-jitsu
Brazilian emigrants to the United States
People from Teresópolis
People awarded a black belt in Brazilian jiu-jitsu
Sportspeople from Rio de Janeiro (state)